Arthur D. Ferguson FRMS (1869 – 24 May 1928) was a banker with the British Guiana Bank and a philatelist who signed the Roll of Distinguished Philatelists in 1923. Ferguson was an expert in the stamps of British Guiana about which he wrote in The British Guiana Philatelic Journal. He was the founder (1903) and Secretary of the British Guiana Philatelic Society.

He was a non-resident Fellow of the Royal Colonial Institute, now the Royal Commonwealth Society, elected 1909.

References

Signatories to the Roll of Distinguished Philatelists
1869 births
1928 deaths
Philatelists
British bankers
Fellows of the Royal Philatelic Society London
Philately of British Guiana